Phragmipedium vittatum is a species of orchid endemic to west-central and southeastern Brazil.

External links 

vittatum
Endemic orchids of Brazil